Beni, sometimes El Beni, is a northeastern department of Bolivia, in the lowlands region of the country. It is the second-largest department in the country (after Santa Cruz), covering 213,564 square kilometers (82,458 sq mi), and it was created by supreme decree on November 18, 1842, during the administration of General José Ballivián. Its capital is Trinidad.

Population

With a population of 420,000 (2006 census), Beni is the second least-populated of the nine departments of Bolivia, after Pando.

Although Beni is rich in natural resources, the poverty level of its inhabitants is high, mainly as a result of centuries of exploitation of native populations by European-descended elites. The main economic activities are agriculture, timber, and cattle. In addition, an underground economy linked to illegal narcotics activities flourished in the area during the last decades of the 20th century, with many cocaine laboratories hidden behind the façade of remote cattle ranches.

The Beni region is wide and flat, featuring many large mounds connected by straight earthen causeways, which are believed by researchers to have been built by ancient inhabitants. The earthwork mounds provide raised living areas and enable the growth of trees that could not survive otherwise in the frequently flooded lowland area. In the 21st century, archeologists and anthropologists such as Americans Clark Erickson and William Balée, respectively, believe these earthwork structures are evidence of a large and sophisticated indigenous civilization that flourished for thousands of years before European colonization.

The first European settlers in this area were Spanish Jesuit missionaries during the 18th century, sent to convert the native inhabitants, chiefly in the southern half of the department. The religious origins of many of the Beni's towns can be attested to by the centrality of the local church in most of the communities, and in the very names of the towns: Trinidad, Santa Ana, San Borja, Reyes, etc. Today, the Beni region is the seat of the Roman Catholic Apostolic Vicariate of El Beni.

The importance of cattle ranching is prominent in the regional culture. Cowboys, or "vaqueros", still play an important role in Beni society, comprising a large portion of the working class. Other industries significant to the region include logging, small-scale fishing and hunting, farming, and in recent years, eco-tourism.

Though the Beni lies in the southern reaches of the Amazon Basin, an area renowned for tropical disease, the population has fewer health problems than in the Andes Region, especially those related to malnutrition.

The inhabitants (Benianos) are mostly descendants of Cruceños (people from Santa Cruz) who streamed north following the course of navigable rivers, and native peoples.

The Beniano diet consists largely of rice, bananas, beef, and fish. Some popular dishes include Majao, Masaco, and others, many featuring cured/salted meats.

The majority of the population in Beni is mestizo. The white/mestizo Benianos have traditionally been mistrustful, and often somewhat contemptuous, of Andean culture. They identify as being lighter skinned and of more Spanish ancestry than the Quechua and Aymara-speaking populations of the highlands. Considerable resentment existed against the central government, which allegedly did very little to build roads or integrate the Beni into the economy and political life of Bolivia. These attitudes persisted although Beni residents benefited greatly by the Agrarian Reform instituted following the 1952 Revolution, with many citizens gaining ownership of significant tracts of land. Most of these turned to cattle ranching. The absence of a reliable road linking the department to the main centers of power in the country (owing to the difficult terrain) continued to contribute to the Benianos' perception of isolation, as did a downturn in the cattle industry. As a result, both the white/mestizo population and departmental authorities supported the Santa Cruz-led effort to federalize the country and devolve powers to the departments at the expense of the central government. Considerable social unrest took place in 2007 and 2008, leading some to consider separatism as plausible.

History

Beni was a very important center of a pre-Columbian civilization known as the hydraulic culture of Las Lomas (the hills), a culture that constructed over 20,000 man-made artificial hills, all interconnected by thousands of square kilometers of aqueducts, channels, embankments, artificial lakes and lagoons, as well as terraces. Between about 4000 BC (and probably earlier as this date is taken from ceramics that have been carbon dated) and the 13th century AD this region was settled by sophisticated and organized groups of human societies. Their civil structures were based, both environmentally and economically, on the use of specific environmental characteristics (such as the use of aquatic plants as fertilizer, and enormous fishing systems they constructed). Miles of these channels and man-made earthworks are visible from the air when flying over Beni.

When the Spanish arrived, the region had already been in decline for about three hundred years. However, this is where many products that are now used worldwide originated in native cultivation: among them tobacco, peanuts, cotton, cassava (manioc), vanilla and sweet potatoes. The Spanish initially were intensely interested in this area. During the first century of colonization, they believed the mythical city of El Dorado (also known as Paititi) could be found in this region. However, they never found this legendary city of gold and they soon lost interest in the area, which would remain marginalized for several centuries after.

Between the 19th and 20th centuries northern Beni became Bolivia's rubber capital. The abundance of rubber trees attracted many people to the region, many of them adventurers and workers (many of whom were indigenous) to work in the huge rubber plantations that arose. The worldwide demand for rubber rose with industrialization and the use of automotive vehicles. For decades this was one of the most active, dynamic regions of Bolivia. Cachuela Esperanza was an important center for rubber exports as it is located along the shores of the Beni River. As a measure of its success, it had one of the best-equipped hospitals in Bolivia at the end of the 19th century. But these enormous rubber plantations all but disappeared by the end of the Second World War, as developers had been cultivating rubber introduced to plantations of Southeast Asia and Africa. Today many of the properties have been converted to cattle ranches. Only some small rubber producers still use the river to transport their production.

Government
The chief executive office of Bolivia departments (since May 2010) is the governor, who is elected to office; until then, the office was called the prefect. Until 2006 the prefect was appointed by the president of Bolivia. As of 2011 Beni had an interim governor, Haysen Ribera Leigue, who was selected by the Departmental Legislative Assembly on 16 December 2011. Governor Ernesto Suárez Sattori, who was elected on 4 April 2010, was suspended following his indictment for irregular expenditures related to a power plant in San Borja, Beni, in compliance with a Bolivian legal mandate that indicted officials may not continue to serve. A replacement for the governor was to be elected in a special election on 20 January 2013.

Languages
The dominant language in the department is Spanish. The following table shows the number of those belonging to the recognized group of speakers.

Places of interest
 Beni Biological Station Biosphere Reserve
 Isiboro Sécure National Park and Indigenous Territory
 Cachuela Esperanza
 Pilón Lajas Biosphere Reserve and Communal Lands

See also

References

Gonzalez Moscoso, Rene. 1984. Enciclopedia Boliviana: Diccionario Geográfico Boliviano. Editorial “Los Amigos del Libro”, La Paz. 278pp.

External links

 Weather in Beni
 Bolivian Music and Web Varieties
 Departmental Government of Beni
 Beni Department
 Full information of Beni Department

 
Departments of Bolivia
States and territories established in 1842